Jeremy Blachman (born 1979), a 2005 graduate of Harvard Law School, is a journalist and the author of Anonymous Lawyer: A Novel.

Biography
Blachman graduated from Hunter College High School in 1996.  He received his undergraduate degree from Princeton University and currently lives in New York.

Anonymous Lawyer
Blachman started the Anonymous Lawyer blog in his second year at Harvard Law School taking on the satirical persona of a law firm hiring partner".  After revealing his identity to the New York Times he earned a book deal with Henry Holt to turn the blog into a novel.  Anonymous Lawyer: A Novel was published in hardcover in 2006, and then in paperback by Picador (imprint) in 2007.

The book was in development for a sitcom adaptation at NBC.

Anonymous Lawyer has been translated into Korean, Italian, Polish, Thai, Hebrew and Russian.

Journalism
Blachman's journalism and writing has appeared in McSweeney's, FanGraphs, the Wall Street Journal, The New York Times, The New Republic, Moment, Lusso, Kveller, The Bygone Bureau, Splitsider, Grin & Tonic, Thought Catalog, The Millions, The Nervous Breakdown, SparkLife and LA Weekly.

References

External links
Interview with The New York Inquirer
Virtually Fiction (article from the Harvard Gazette)

Hunter College High School alumni
American male journalists
Princeton University alumni
Living people
1979 births
Harvard Law School alumni